Peter Simon Msigwa (born 8 June 1965) is a Tanzanian CHADEMA politician and Member of Parliament for Iringa Town constituency for two consecutive terms since 2010.

References

1965 births
Living people
Chadema MPs
Tanzanian MPs 2010–2015
Sangu Secondary School alumni